Thaye Neeye Thunai is a 1987 Indian Tamil-language film directed by P. R. Somasundar. The film stars Karthik and K. R. Vijaya .

Cast 

Karthik
K. R. Vijaya as Goddess Adhiparashakthi
Pandiyan
R. Sarathkumar
Master Jiiva
S. S. Chandran
Jai Ganesh
Senthil
Sudha Chandran
Srividya
Pallavi (actress)
Sumitra
Kalpana Raghavendar
Sabitha Anand

References

External links
 

1980 films
1987 films
1980s Tamil-language films